The second McConnell government (20 May 2003 – 17 May 2007) was formed following the 2003 general election to the 2nd Scottish Parliament. Jack McConnell was re-appointed as First Minister on 20 May 2003 and headed another Labour–Liberal Democrat coalition government.

History
On 14 May Labour and Liberal Democrat MSPs voted on a coalition deal, that had been finalised between the parties negotiating teams.

List of ministers

References

Scottish governments
2003 establishments in Scotland
2007 disestablishments in Scotland
Coalition governments of the United Kingdom
Ministries of Elizabeth II